Citizen James is a BBC sitcom that ran for three series between 24 November 1960 and 23 November 1962. The show featured comedian and actor Sid James and Sydney Tafler with Bill Kerr and Liz Fraser appearing in early episodes. It was initially written by the comedy writing team of Galton and Simpson, who based the characters very much on the "Sidney Balmoral James" and "Bill Kerr, the dim-witted Australian" roles that they had played in Hancock's Half Hour.
 
The first series was set around 'Charlie's Nosh Bar', a cafe in Soho, and centred on Sid's get-rich-quick schemes. He is helped by "Billy the Kerr" and quite often frustrated by the local bookmaker Albert Welshman (Tafler). Liz Fraser played Sid's long-suffering girlfriend who has been waiting for seven years for Sid to set the date.

Changes were made to the format after the first series. Sid James' character was changed to be something of a people's champion, campaigning for social justice. Bill Kerr and Liz Fraser departed and Sidney Tafler played a different character: Charlie Davenport. The location switched from Soho to Sid and Charlie sharing a house. 
 
Later episodes were written by then Morecambe & Wise writers Dick Hills and Sid Green.

Despite not being written by Galton and Simpson, the sets and familiar supporting cast gave these last two series a recognisable Hancock feeling to the proceedings.

Episodes
Like many BBC series of this time, episodes were not necessarily retained (see Wiping). Only eleven episodes from the three series are known to still exist.

Series 1
E01 - The Race
Out of money, Sid hits on an idea to fix a "waiter's race" by use of a ringer.

E02 - The Elixir
Sid and Bill try their hand in the snake-oil business, selling "Dr." Sidney James's Magical Elixir.

E03 - The Money
Liz entrusts £300 to Sid to take to the Bank, but Sid and Bill soon find themselves parted from the money by Albert.

E04 - The Rivals
Albert has a wager with Sid that he can get a date with Sid's fiancée. And at 10-1, Sid can't resist the odds.

E05 - The Raffle
Sid and Bill have to organise a raffle to replace the 'Nosh Bar' Christmas money which went on Sid's gambling debts.

E06 - The Brand Image
Sid and Bill try their hand at selling cigarettes but need an actor to help launch their new brand.

Series Two
E2 - Crusty Bread
Sid and Charlie set out to find why the old style crusty bread loaves have disappeared. Why aren't they baked any more if people still want them?
E11 - Teenagers
Sid and Charlie go rushing across the country to stop a young couple on their way to Gretna Green.

Series Three
31.08.62 - E1 - The Hospital (missing)
07.09.62 - E2 - The Play's The Thing (missing)
14.09.62 - E3 - The Tennis Ball (missing)
21.09.62 - E4 - It's Not Cricket (missing)
28.09.62 - E5 - The Reporter (missing)
05.10.62 - E6 - The Day Out 
TBA 
12.10.62 - E7 - The Transistor (missing)
19.10.62 - E8 - The Old People's Outing (missing)
26.10.62 - E9 - A Perfect Friendship? (missing)
02.11.62 - E10 - The Watchdog
Finding a burglar in their house the boys take security for the street into their own hands.
09.11.62 - E11 - The Librarian (missing)
16.11.62 - E12 - The Tube Station (missing)
23.11.62 - E13 - The Jury
The boys are on jury duty, Sid is hoping for major case.

DVD
The then-surviving episodes, comprising the complete Series One, and two episodes each from Series Two and Series Three, were released as a collection by Acorn Media UK in February 2012. A further episode, the sixth episode of series three, was subsequently found in a store room of Monaco Television, by Philip Morris.

References

External links

Citizen James at the BBC Online Comedy Guide

Citizen James at British TV Resources

1960 British television series debuts
1962 British television series endings
1960s British sitcoms
BBC television sitcoms
Lost BBC episodes
Television series created by Ray Galton
Television series created by Alan Simpson